John Johnson III (born December 19, 1995) is an American football free safety who is a free agent. He played college football at Boston College.

Early years
He attended Northwestern High School in Hyattsville, Maryland and played wide receiver and safety for head coach Brian Pierre. Johnson finished his senior year with 50 combined tackles, 13 pass deflections, six tackles for a loss, and five interceptions.

He was rated as a two-star recruit by 247sports and Rivals.com. Johnson received ten offers in total from Boston College, Lehigh, Bucknell, Buffalo, Duke, UMass, Missouri, Pittsburgh, Towson,  and Ohio. On June 1, 2012, Johnson took his only college visit to Boston College and then attended a camp held by them in late June where he was said to be very impressive and one of the top performers. Boston college's special teams coordinator and defensive line coach Al Washington recruited him to join their football team. On July 23, 2012, he officially committed to play for Boston College and cited academics as the main reason on why he chose to attend BC.

College career
In 2013, Johnson began attending Boston College. He made his collegiate debut in the Eagles' season-opening 24–14 victory over the FCS' #5 Villanova Wildcats. On November 16, 2013, he recorded three solo tackles and made one tackle for a loss in a 38–21 victory over NC State. On December 31, 2013, Johnson made his first career fumble recovery during a 19–42 loss to Arizona in the 2013 AdvoCare V100 Bowl. He played cornerback and on special teams as a freshman and finished his season with four combined tackles, a tackle for a loss, and a fumble recovery in 12 games.

Professional career
On January 28, 2017, Johnson accepted an invitation to the Senior Bowl and played for the North who lost 15–16 to the South. He had an impressive week at practice leading up to the Senior Bowl and had a meeting with the Indianapolis Colts. Johnson attended the NFL combine and completed all of the required combine and positional drills. On March 14, 2017, he participated at Boston College's pro day and chose to attempt the broad jump and run positional drills. Among 20 NFL teams had team representatives and scouts attend, that included defensive backs coaches from the New York Jets and Detroit Lions, to scout Johnson, Matt Millano, Patrick Towles, and three other teammates. He was ranked as the seventh best free safety prospect in the draft by DraftScout.com.

Los Angeles Rams

2017
Johnson III was selected in the third round (91st overall) of the 2017 NFL Draft by the Los Angeles Rams. 

On  June 9, 2017, the Los Angeles Rams signed Johnson to a four-year, $3.25 million contract that included a signing bonus of $757,752.

Throughout training camp, he competed with Maurice Alexander and Blake Countess for the job as the starting strong safety. The Rams' newly hired head coach at the time, Sean McVay, named Johnson the third strong safety on the Rams' depth chart, behind Alexander and Countess, to begin the regular season.

He made his professional regular season debut in the Los Angeles Rams' season-opener against the Indianapolis Colts and made one tackle during the 46–9 victory. On October 8, 2017, Johnson made his first career start after the Rams deactivated the struggling Mo Alexander for the game. Johnson recorded three combined tackles, defended two passes, and returned the first interception of his career for 69-yards after picking off Seattle Seahawks' quarterback Russell Wilson in a 10–16 loss. In Week 7, he collected a season-high five combined tackles in a 33–0 win over the Arizona Cardinals. On December 10, 2017, Johnson collected a season-high 11 combined tackles (seven solo) and two pass deflections during a 43–35 loss to the Philadelphia Eagles in Week 14. He finished his rookie season with 75 combined tackles (56 solo), 11 pass deflections, and an interception in 16 games and 11 starts. Pro Football Focus gave him an overall grade of 85.8, ranking him 15th among all qualifying safeties in 2017.

The Los Angeles Rams finished atop the NFC West with an 11–5 record. On January 6, 2018, Johnson started his first career playoff game and recorded six combined tackles in the Rams' 26–13 loss to the Atlanta Falcons in the NFC Wildcard Game.

2018
In week 1 against the Oakland Raiders, Johnson intercepted quarterback Derek Carr and made 9 tackles on Monday Night Football.
In week 14 against the Chicago Bears, Johnson intercepted Mitchell Trubisky in a 15–6 loss. Johnson finished the 2018 season with 119 tackles, 4 interceptions and a forced fumble. In the Divisional Round against the Dallas Cowboys, Johnson recorded 7 tackles in the 30–22 win. In the NFC Championship Game against the New Orleans Saints, Johnson had 4 tackles and caught the big interception in overtime to help the Rams win 26–23 to send them to Super Bowl LIII where they faced the New England Patriots. In the Super Bowl, Johnson recorded 7 tackles in a 13–3 loss.

2019
In week 2 against the Saints, Johnson recorded his first interception of the season off Drew Brees in the 27–9 win.
In week 3 against the Cleveland Browns, Johnson intercepted Baker Mayfield in the end zone late in the fourth quarter, sealing a 20–13 Rams win. He was placed on injured reserve on October 16, 2019 with a shoulder injury.

2020
In week 3 against the Buffalo Bills, with the Rams down 28–3 in the third quarter, Johnson was credited with an interception after coming down with simultaneous possession of the ball with Bills tight end Tyler Kroft, allowing the Rams to rally and take the lead in the fourth quarter before Buffalo responded with a game-winning drive in the last few minutes.

Cleveland Browns
On March 17, 2021, Johnson signed a three-year, $33.75 million deal with the Cleveland Browns.

On March 15, 2023, Johnson was released by the Browns.

NFL career statistics

Personal life
Johnson has an older brother named Travis. They were raised by their parents, John Johnson II and Tanya Johnson. While at Boston College he enrolled as a communication major in the Morrissey College of Arts and Science. Johnson is a  recipient of the Jay McGillis '93 Memorial Scholarship Fund.

References

External links
  Boston College Eagles bio
  Los Angeles Rams bio

1995 births
Living people
American football safeties
Boston College Eagles football players
Cleveland Browns players
Los Angeles Rams players
People from Hyattsville, Maryland
Players of American football from Maryland
Sportspeople from the Washington metropolitan area